Ajaana UDonto bostu ba Aw-Oo-Baw (Unidentified Flying Object or UFO) is the second and debut single album by the Bengali rock band Moheener Ghoraguli. It was released on 21 August in 1978 as a Standard Play 45-rpm disc by Hindusthan Records, and includes two singles.

Track listing

Personnel
 Gautam Chattopadhyay – lead guitar
 Pradip Chatterjee – vocals
 Ranjon Ghoshal – vocals
 Tapesh Bandyopadhyay – vocals
 Tapas Das – vocals

Others
 Mridool Roy – cello
 Ashis Biswas – cello   (bass)
 Baren Sutar – viola
 Ivan Rodericks – violin [first violin]
 Sumitra Byapari – violin [first violin]
 Shilpi Panja – violin [second violin]
 Shyamal Biswas – violin [second violin]

Technical
 Harish Parekh – engineer [engineered by]

References

External links

1978 albums
Moheener Ghoraguli albums
Single albums